Emily Rose Compagno (born November 9, 1979) is an American attorney, TV host, and former National Football League (NFL) cheerleader who currently serves as a Co-Host of Outnumbered on Fox News Channel (FNC). She frequently appears on the late-night show Gutfeld!. Compagno also hosts The FOX True Crime Podcast w/ Emily Compagno on Fox News Radio as of February 2023.

Early life and education
Compagno was born in east Oakland's Oak Knoll Naval Hospital, Oakland California and raised in El Cerrito, California, the daughter of Katherine (née Bertsch, of English, Bohemian, and Baden-Wurttemberg descent) and John Compagno, of Sicilian descent. She has two sisters.

She graduated with a B.A. in political science from the University of Washington where she was awarded the Air Force Reserve Officer Training Corps' Cadet of the Quarter Award. She graduated with a J.D. from the University of San Francisco School of Law in 2006, where she was President of the Federalist Society and Articles Editor of the Intellectual Property Bulletin.

Family

Her great-grandfather served in World War I and World War II. Her great-great-uncle served in the U.S. Army in World War I. His sister Luella served in the U.S. Army Nurse Corps in World War II, as did nine members of Luella's immediate family. In 1930, Emily's great-great-grandmother Rosa visited her children buried in foreign soil as part of the Gold Star Mother Pilgrimage. Her great-great cousin served in the U.S. Navy, and her great-uncle in the U.S. Army.

Her father John served as a Commander in the U.S. Navy Medical Corps, and two uncles served in the U.S. Army. Emily's second cousin once removed and his wife served as U.S. Navy P-3 and EP-3 pilots supporting Operation Enduring Freedom.

Career
After passing the California bar, she worked as a criminal defense attorney in San Francisco while also serving as captain of the Oakland Raiders cheerleading squad, the Raiderettes. The NFL selected her as an Ambassador and she promoted the NFL brand in Beijing and Shanghai, and was one of five NFL cheerleaders selected by the USO to visit U.S. troops stationed in Iraq and Kuwait.

Compagno was a Senior Judge Judicial Extern for John T. Noonan at the U.S. Court of Appeals for the Ninth Circuit. She then went on to work as a federal attorney at the Social Security Administration. She passed the Washington bar and has also held legal positions in Cape Town, South Africa, and Rio de Janeiro, Brazil.

In 2018, Compagno accepted a position at Fox News as a contributor and legal analyst. She served as a semi-regular co-host of the weekday talk show The Five and appears on other FNC programs, such as Gutfeld!, offering opinions or legal analysis on the news of the day. On March 9, 2020, Crimes That Changed America, a show on Fox Nation hosted by Compagno, debuted its first season.

Compagno was then named a permanent Co-Host of Outnumbered on January 25, 2021. Her co-hosts are Harris Faulkner and Kayleigh McEnany. Compagno occasionally guest-hosts The Five.

On February 27, 2023, Fox News announced that Compagno was named host of a new podcast called The FOX True Crime Podcast on Fox News Radio. Episodes air every Tuesday and Thursday.

Personal life 
Compagno lives in New York City. She is active with nonprofits dedicated to U.S. veterans, law enforcement, and K9 causes.

References

External links

1979 births
American television reporters and correspondents
Living people
People from California
American people of German descent
Fox News people
University of Washington College of Arts and Sciences alumni
American women television journalists
University of San Francisco School of Law alumni
People from El Cerrito, California
Lawyers from San Francisco
21st-century American women
American people of Italian descent